Captain Samuel Van Leer (January 7, 1747 – October 15, 1825) was a military officer from Pennsylvania who served as a captain in the Continental Army during the American Revolutionary War and as lieutenant in the Chester County Light Horse Volunteers from 1781 to 1785. After his retirement from the military, he owned the Reading Furnace ironworks.

He was a member of the influential Van Leer family. His father Bernardhus Van Leer was an early settler of the Province of Pennsylvania. He married the sister of American Revolutionary War General Anthony Wayne. His son Isaac Van Leer was a U.S. Congressman.

Early life
Van Leer was born in 1747 in Marple Township, Province of Pennsylvania, British America to Mary (Branson) and Bernardhus Van Leer. His maternal grandfather is William Branson who was an ironworks pioneer and owned the historical home Warrenpoint.

In 1770, Samuel married Hannah Wayne, daughter to Isaac Wayne and sister to Anthony Wayne.

American Revolutionary War
Van Leer was commissioned captain of the Seventh Company, Fifth Battalion of the Chester County Militia on May 17, 1777. He fought with Anthony Wayne during the Battle of Paoli, the Battle of Brandywine and the Battle of Germantown. All of his brothers were military officers during the war.

He was a commanding officer in the 4th Battalion 1780 under Lt. Col. John Bartholomew. He served as lieutenant of the Chester County Light Horse Volunteers from 1780 to 1781.

Later life and death

After his retirement from the military, Captain Samuel went on to grow his Iron business in Reading Furnace, formerly owned by his grandfather William Branson. He lived in the historical mansion on site with his wife Hannah.

He inherited two plantations in East Nantmeal, Pennsylvania from his brother, Dr. Branson Van Leer, and died there in October, 1825.

Family
Van Leer and his family owned several historic properties including the Van Leer Cabin in Tredyffin Township, Pennsylvania and the Van Leer Pleasant Hill Plantation in West Nantmeal, Pennsylvania.

Samuel had eight children with his wife Hannah. On  10 July 1786, Hannah gave birth to twin girls and died due to birth complications. After her death, Anthony Wayne offered to have Van Leer's children stay with his family. Van Leer declined the offer and kept his children at his home and never remarried.

See also 
 Barnardus Van Leer House

References

External links
 
 The medical Van Leer family of Pennsylvania and New Jersey

1747 births
1825 deaths
American Episcopalians
American ironmasters
American people of German descent
Burials in Pennsylvania
Continental Army officers from Pennsylvania
History of Pennsylvania
People from Chester County, Pennsylvania
People from Marple Township, Pennsylvania
People from Reading, Pennsylvania
People of colonial Pennsylvania
People of Pennsylvania in the American Revolution
People of the American Revolution
Underground Railroad people
Van Leer family
18th-century ironmasters
19th-century ironmasters